A performer is an artist in the performing arts. 

Performer(s) or The Performer may also refer to:

 Performer (magazine), an American music magazine
 Performer (role variant), in the Keirsey Temperament Sorter
 The Performer (James Righton album), 2020
 The Performer (Marty Robbins album), 1978
 OpenGL Performer, a commercial software library based on OpenGL
 Performers College, Corringham, Essex, England
 Performers House, a defunct folk high school in Silkeborg, Denmark
 "Performer", a song by Rebecca Black from Let Her Burn
 "Performer", a song by Trey Songz

See also
The Performers (disambiguation)